The Rachka is a small river located in the Basmanny and Tagansky Districts, in the Central Administrative Okrug, in the center of Moscow and a former left tributary of the Moskva. Today it flows into the Yauza.

References

Rivers of Moscow